Alaine is a Jamaican-American singer, songwriter, producer, and actor.

1998–2004
In 1988, Alaine appeared in movie Clara's Heart alongside Whoopi Goldberg. Through the late 1990s and early 2000s, Alaine lived in the United States and did songwriting and singing back up for Rocafella artists such as Cam'ron and Freeway.

She moved back to Jamaica in the summer of 2004 to focus on her own music after working in investment banking at JP Morgan Chase.

2005–present
In 2005 "No Ordinary Love" was her breakthrough single. She has released several hits including 'Deeper', 'Dreaming of You', 'Sacrifice', 'Rise in Love', 'Born To Win', 'Bye, Bye, Bye', and 'You are Me'. 
Her debut album, titled Sacrifice, was released in early 2008. Her album, titled Luv A Dub, was released in Japan in August 2009. Ten of Hearts was released in 2015.

She has performed all over the world, garnering huge followings in many East African countries. She has had success collaborating with the who's who of reggae music including Shaggy, Beres Hammond, Beenie Man and many others. She co-wrote the hit songs 'Gimmie Likkle One Drop' and 'Wanty Wanty' with Tarrus Riley and wrote the hit song 'Tight Skirt' for Samantha J. She also wrote the hit song 'Automatic' for the queen of reggae music, Marcia Griffiths.

The first song she independently produced and released, 'You Are Me', was inspired by the incursion that took place in Jamaica's Tivoli Gardens. Alaine draws attention to the fact that we are all one and if we treat each other the way we treat ourselves, a lot of the world's ills could be healed.

Alaine recently released a new video for her hit song 'You Give Me Hope'. She is a resident judge on Jamaica's number one reality talent search show 'Digicel Rising Stars'. Her upbeat personality and beautiful energy has cemented her in the hearts of Jamaicans and many fans worldwide. Her acting and comedic abilities have been getting increased exposure on her instagram page as she displays her creative abilities acting and singing as a variety of different characters.

Discography

Studio albums

 Release on November 27, 2007, on Don Corleon Records

Release on August 6, 2009, on Koyashi Haikyu Records

Release on May 26, 2015

Singles

Solo singles
 "Sacrifice"
 "Without you"
 "No Ordinary Love"
 "Forever More" (featuring Tarrus Riley)
 "Flashback to Dancehall" (featuring 8 Bars)
 "Color Blind"
 "Luv a Dub" (featuring Buju Banton))
 "Me & You (Secret)" (featuring Chino)
 "Touch (On and On)"
 "Jehovah"

Featured singles
 "Dreaming Of You" (Beenie Man featuring Alaine)
 "I Love Yuh" (Busy Signal featuring Alaine)
 "Dying for a Cure" (Wayne Marshall featuring Alaine)
 "HeartBeat" (Mavado featuring Alaine)
 "Tonight" (Machel Montano featuring Alaine)
 "Love Sound" <small>(Beres Hammond featuring Alaine, small>
 "For Your Eyes Only" (Shaggy featuring Alaine)
 "Ride" (Tony Matterhorn featuring Alaine)
 "Nakupenda Pia (I LOVE YOU TOO)" (Kevin Wyre featuring Alaine)
 "Wafula" (Alaine featuring Churchill)
 "I DO" (Willy Paul featuring Alaine)/

References

External links

 Official Website
 Alaine Myspace Page

1978 births
Living people
21st-century Jamaican women singers
Jamaican people of Taíno descent
American emigrants to Jamaica